Tlachichila is a small town located in the municipality of Nochistlán de Mejía in the Mexican state of Zacatecas.
Mexican Federal Highway 131 runs through it.
Populated places in Zacatecas